Koçtepe is a village in the Cizre District of Şırnak Province in Turkey. The village is populated by Kurds of the Omerkan tribe and had a population of 573 in 2021.

References 

Villages in Cizre District
Kurdish settlements in Şırnak Province